The Bolivia women's national under-18 basketball team is a national basketball team of Bolivia, administered by the Federación Boliviana de Básquetbol (FBB).

It represents the country in international under-18 (under age 18) women's basketball competitions.

See also
Bolivia women's national basketball team
Bolivia women's national under-17 basketball team

References

External links
Bolivia Basketball Records at FIBA Archive

U-18
Women's national under-18 basketball teams